Un Paso Adelante (One Step Forward) is a Spanish TV drama similar to the American 1980s TV series Fame. It was originally broadcast on Spanish channel Antena 3 from 2002 to 2005. It has also been a huge success in Spanish-speaking countries (including Latin America), in Germany (where it was retitled Dance – Der Traum vom Ruhm), Italy (where it was retitled Paso Adelante), Serbia, Montenegro (where it was retitled Korak napred) and in France (where it was retitled Un, Dos, Tres). It began airing on Séries+ in Canada in 2011.
Choreographers: Luka Yexi (seasons 1+2) Anna & Carlos Infante (seasons 3+4) Myriam Benedited (seasons 5+6)

Plot 
The show focuses on the professors and the students of Carmen Arranz, one of the most prestigious art schools in Spain. The school is located in Madrid. The story follows Lola, Pedro, Rober, Jero, Ingrid, Silvia and Marta. They want to be successful singers, dancers and actors but they learn as they go along that the path to fame is not an easy one.

Cast list

Professors
 Lola Herrera as Carmen Arranz
 Beatriz Rico as Diana de Miguel
 Natalia Millán as Adela Ramos
  as Juan Taberner
  as Cristóbal Soto
 Toni Acosta as Jacinta "J.J." Jimenez
 Jaime Blanch as Gaspar Ruiz
 Pedro Peña as Antonio Milá
  as Horacio Alonso
 Fanny Gautier as Alicia Jauregi
 Esther Arroyo as Irene Miró
 Juan Echanove as Mariano Cuéllar
 Marta Ribera as Eva Ruiz
 Satur Barrios as Cristina
 Rocío Calvo as Claudia Romero
  as Purificación "Puri" Lacarino

Students
 Beatriz Luengo as Dolores "Lola" Fernández
 Miguel Ángel Muñoz as Roberto "Rober" Arenales
 Pablo Puyol as Pedro Salvador
 Mónica Cruz as Silvia Jauregui
 Silvia Marty as Ingrid Munoz
 Dafne Fernández as Marta Ramos
 Raúl Peña as Jeronimo "Jero" Juiz
 Yotuel Romero as Pavel Rodriguez
  as Erika Sanz
 Arantxa Valdivia as Luisa Ruiz
 Patricia Arizmendi as Sonia
 Junior Miguez as Junior Miguez
 Asier Etxeandia as Benito "Beni" Lopez
  as Josè
 Ricardo Amador as Rafael "Rafa" Torres
  as Cesar Martín

Others
  as Sebastián
 Elisabeth Jordan as Tania
 José Ángel Egido as Víctor Arenales
  as Román Fernández
 William Miller as Nacho Salinas

Main characters
Silvia Jáuregui (Mónica Cruz) is the best female dancer at the school, besides being the director's niece. Her mother was a professional dancer and her father was a conductor. Therefore, she had the opportunity to tour the world with them when they were performing abroad. In the first episodes, she was quite snobbish and reserved. So she had difficulty in making friends. But, throughout the episodes, she became a close friend of Ingrid and Lola. She has had many lovers: Pedro, Rober (who eventually got her pregnant), Pavel, cocaine addict Alvaro, and Horacio (an ex-boyfriend of her aunt's).

Dolores "Lola" Fernández (Beatriz Luengo) is a young woman who has devoted her entire life to dance and her family (her father and younger brother). She has a talent for singing but her real passion is dancing. Throughout the episodes, she has had many lovers: Jerónimo, Pavel (played by Orishas’ frontman Yotuel who is also Beatriz Luengo's partner in real life), and Pedro.

Ingrid Muñoz (Silvia Marty) is an extroverted and optimistic young woman who idolises Aretha Franklin. She had a romance with Juan, one of her teachers. She broke up with him, however, after he got his colleague Diana pregnant.

Pedro Salvador (Pablo Puyol) is the son of an Asturian fisherman and he moved to Madrid to learn how to dance. Actually, he considers dance as a way to overcome his shyness towards girls. Besides, he has to work at part-time jobs in order to pay for his scholarship.

Roberto “Rober” Arenales (Miguel Ángel Muñoz) is the seventh son of a wealthy family from San Sebastian. He likes behaving as a tough guy, and he's a ladies' man. He has a son, with an ex-girlfriend from when he was 16.

Jeronimo “Jero” Juiz (Raul Peña), is a songwriter ready to do anything to gain fame. He had a romance with Lola but she ended up cheating on him with another student, Pavel.

Marta Ramos (Dafne Fernández) is a classical dancer. She is dance teacher Adela's sister. She had an affair with Pedro, and afterwards, with Rober. In the final season, she was diagnosed with a heart disease. But, eventually, she overcame it and returned to dance.

Adaptations

References

External links 
 

Antena 3 (Spanish TV channel) network series
Television shows set in Madrid
2002 Spanish television series debuts
2005 Spanish television series endings
2000s Spanish drama television series